'Winter Banana' is an apple cultivar with high-quality fruit used for fresh eating. The fruit is large, with smooth yellow skin that shows bruises more than red apples do. The flesh is rather coarse textured, moderately soft, sweet and aromatic. Sugar 12.5%, acid 7g/litre, vitamin C 12mg/100g.

References

Apple cultivars